San Benedetto is a village in Tuscany, central Italy, administratively a frazione of the comune of Cascina, province of Pisa.

San Benedetto is about 15 km from Pisa and 3 km from Cascina.

References

Bibliography 
 

Frazioni of the Province of Pisa